Defending champions Alfie Hewett and Gordon Reid defeated Stéphane Houdet and Nicolas Peifer in the final, 7–5, 7–6(7–3) to win the men's doubles wheelchair tennis title at the 2021 Australian Open. It was their first step towards a Grand Slam.

Seeds

Draw

Bracket

References

External links
 Drawsheet on ausopen.com

Wheelchair Men's Doubles
2021 Men's Doubles